Civil Service Supply Association was a department store on the Strand, London. Founded in the 1860s on Victoria Street, the shop moved to the Strand in the following decade, remaining open until 1982.

History
In 1864, a group of clerks in the General Post Office joined together to buy a half chest of tea. Their first transaction resulted in them saving 9 pence to the pound, and they decided to extend their purchasing to coffee, sugar and other grocery products.

In January 1865, they formed the Post Office Supply Association, a co-operative with forty members. The co-operative was so successful that by April the scheme had been opened up to all civil servants and the name changed to the Civil Service Supply Association. Civil servants could purchase tickets for 2 shillings and sixpence, which would entitle them to purchase goods at the store or from firms associated with the association.

Their first premises were on Victoria Street, but by 1877 they had moved to 425 Strand, a building designed by architects Lockwood & Mawson. In 1927, the co-operative was incorporated as a private company, becoming a fully fledged department store and severing its links with the Civil Service. The building was completely rebuilt at this time in the art deco style. The store remained open until 1982 when it was closed following a severe fire.

References

External links
 

Defunct department stores of the United Kingdom
Defunct retail companies of the United Kingdom
Retail companies established in 1865
Co-operatives in England
Shops in London